The largest body part is either the largest given body part across all living and extinct organisms or the largest example of a body part within an existing species. The largest animals on the planet are not the only ones to have large body parts, with some smaller animals actually having one particularly enlarged area of the body.

Living animals

Blue whale

As the largest animal that has existed, the blue whale has the largest instance of several body parts.
 Its heart typically weighs  and can reach  in exceptional cases
 The blue whale's penis typically measures 2.5 metres (8 ft 2 in) to 3 metres (9.8 ft) and a diameter of 30 centimetres (12 in) to 36 centimetres (14 in).

Other animals

 The giant and colossal squids have the largest recorded eyes of any living animal, with a maximum diameter of at least . Only the extinct ichthyosaurs are known to have had larger eyes.
 The giraffe has the longest neck of any land mammal.
 The north Pacific right whale has the largest testes of any mammal.
 The walrus has the largest baculum of any mammal.
 The longest horns ever recorded belonged to a wild water buffalo and measured  from tip to tip.  
 The largest and heaviest brain belongs to the sperm whale, weighing around 9 kilograms.
It was found washed up on the shore of Massachusetts Bay in 1870.
 Bootlace worms can reach great lengths. A specimen was measured at  but this may be unreliable as the body is somewhat elastic.

In proportion to body size
 The Morgan's sphinx hawk moth has the longest proboscis in relation to its body size. Its 25–30 cm proboscis is over 3 times longer than its body. It is also known as Darwin's moth because Charles Darwin predicted its existence some 40 years before it was discovered from experiments he did on an orchid with a "foot long" nectary.
 The tube-lipped nectar bat has the longest tongue of any mammal in relation to its body size. Its  tongue is 1.5 times longer than its body, and must be kept inside its rib cage.
 The barnacle is the creature with the largest penis as a proportion of its body size.
 Among vertebrates, the Argentine blue-bill duck has the longest penis in relation to its body size.
 The vampire squid has the largest eyes of any animal relative to its size.
 The kiwi lays the largest egg of any bird relative to its size up to a quarter of the mass of the female.
 Shrews have the largest brain-to-body mass ratio of any animal, with brains that are 10% of body weight. Humans however have the largest encephalization quotient of any animal.
 Dogs have the largest heart-to-body mass ratio.
 The Jerboa has the largest ear as a proportion of its body size.

Humans

 The longest bone in the human body is the femur.
 The largest artery is the aorta and the largest vein is the inferior vena cava.
 The largest external organ, which is also the largest organ in general, is the skin. 
 The longest muscle is the sartorius muscle in the thigh.
 The longest single nerve is the sciatic nerve in the thigh, counting its branches and axons.

Individual human records  
 The person with the longest tongue is Nick Stoeberl of Salinas, California, United States, whose tongue measures .
 The woman with the longest legs is Svetlana Pankratova.
 The woman with the longest fingernails is Lee Redmond. The total length of her fingernails is 7.513 meters. The person with the longest fingernails on one hand is Shridhar Chillal, the woman with the longest fingernails on one hand is Ayanna Williams.
 The longest head of hair belonged to Xie Qiuping of China and measured  on 8 May 2004.
 The longest ear hair belongs to Victor Anthony of India, measuring 18.1 centimetres (7.12 inches).
 The largest feet belonged to Matthew McGrory. His left foot measured  and he wore size 29 1/2 shoes.

Extinct animals

See also
 Largest organism
 Largest prehistoric organisms
 Giant animal (disambiguation)
 The "strongest" human muscle

References

Animal anatomy
Largest things